Bwlch Rangers A.F.C. are a Welsh football club from Llanelli, Carmarthenshire  in West Wales. They currently play in the Carmarthenshire League Premier Division.

History

The club is one of the most successful teams in the league, having been champions of the top division eight times, and have won the league's senior cup a record eleven times.

Honours

 Carmarthenshire League Premier Division (Tier 1 of Camrthenshire League)  - Champions (2): 1999–2000; 2017–18
 Carmarthenshire League Division One (Tier 1)  - Champions (6):  1937–38; 1949–50; 1952–53; 1953–54; 1956–57; 1957–58 (shared)
 Carmarthenshire League Division One (Tier 2) - Winners: 1990–91  
 Carmarthenshire League Division Two (Tier 3) - Winners: 1976–77; 1981–82; 1987–88  
 Carmarthenshire Senior Cup - Winners (11):  1932–33; 1933–34; 1936–37; 1948–49; 1949–50; 1950–51; 1953–54; 1955–56; 1958–59; 1999–2000; 2007–08
 Carmarthenshire League T G Davies Cup - Winners (10): 1947–48; 1948–49; 1950–51; 1951–52; 1952–53; 1976–77; 1977–78; 1994–95; 1999–2000; 2017–18
 Carmarthenshire League Challenge Cup - Winners (1): 1990–91
 Carmarthenshire League Darch Cup - Winners (2): 2010–11
 West Wales Amateur Cup – Winners: 1947–48

References

External links
Official club Twitter
Official club Facebook

Football clubs in Wales
Sport in Carmarthenshire
Carmarthenshire League clubs
Sport in Llanelli